The 2022 Australian motorcycle Grand Prix (officially known as the Animoca Brands Australian Motorcycle Grand Prix) was the eighteenth round of the 2022 Grand Prix motorcycle racing season. It was held at the Phillip Island Grand Prix Circuit in Phillip Island on 16 October 2022.

In the Moto3 class, Izan Guevara secured the Riders' Championship after taking his sixth win of the season. Additionally, the GasGas Aspar Team secured its first Teams' Championship after Guevara's win and Sergio García's third place.

Background

Miller Corner
During the weekend, the fourth corner of the Phillip Island Circuit, formerly known as the "Honda Corner", was renamed the "Miller Corner" in honor of Jack Miller.

Free practice

MotoGP

Combinated Free Practice 1-2-3 
The top ten riders (written in bold) qualified in Q2.

Free Practice 4

Moto2

Combinated Free Practice 
The top fourteen riders (written in bold) qualified in Q2.

Moto3

Combined Free Practice 1-2-3

Qualifying

MotoGP

Moto2

Moto3

Race

MotoGP

Moto2

 Zonta van den Goorbergh suffered a broken wrist in crash during FP1 and withdrew from the event.

Moto3

Championship standings after the race
Below are the standings for the top five riders, constructors, and teams after the round.

MotoGP

Riders' Championship standings

Constructors' Championship standings

Teams' Championship standings

Moto2

Riders' Championship standings

Constructors' Championship standings

Teams' Championship standings

Moto3

Riders' Championship standings

Constructors' Championship standings

Teams' Championship standings

References

External links

2022 MotoGP race reports
Motorcycle Grand Prix
2022
October 2022 sports events in Australia